The Surinamese ambassador in Beijing is the official representative of the Government in Paramaribo to the Government of the People's Republic of China. He is coacredited in Hanoi.

List of representatives

References 

 
China
Suriname